Sai Prathap Annayyagari (born 20 September 1944) is an Indian politician from Andhra Pradesh. He represented Rajampet in the Lok Sabha from 1989 until 1999 and again from 2004 until 2014. During his last term, he served as Minister of State for Steel for almost two years and Minister of State for Heavy Industries and Public Enterprises for six months in the second Manmohan Singh ministry.

He opposed the Telangana movement, and submitted his resignation as a member of parliament in October 2013 after the government approved the creation of the new state. However, the resignation was rejected on the grounds that it was given under duress.

He was a member of the Indian National Congress throughout his political career until he joined the Telugu Desam Party in March 2016. However, he resigned and rejoined the Congress in May 2019.

References 

1944 births
Living people
Indian National Congress politicians from Andhra Pradesh
India MPs 2009–2014
India MPs 2004–2009
India MPs 1998–1999
India MPs 1996–1997
India MPs 1991–1996
India MPs 1989–1991
Telugu politicians
People from Kolar
Lok Sabha members from Andhra Pradesh
United Progressive Alliance candidates in the 2014 Indian general election
Telugu Desam Party politicians